The quintal or centner is a historical unit of mass in many countries which is usually defined as 100 base units, such as pounds or kilograms. It is a traditional unit of weight in France, Portugal, and Spain and their former colonies. It is commonly used for grain prices in wholesale markets in Ethiopia and India, where 1 quintal = 100 kg.

In British English, it referred to the hundredweight; in American English, it formerly referred to an uncommon measure of 100 kilograms. 

Languages drawing its cognate name for the weight from Romance languages include French, Portuguese, Romanian and Spanish , Italian , Esperanto , Polish . Languages taking their cognates from Germanicized centner include the German , Lithuanian , Swedish , Polish , Russian and Ukrainian , Estonian  and Spanish .

Many European languages have come to translate both the imperial and American hundredweight as their cognate form of quintal or centner.

Name 
The concept has resulted in two different series of masses: Those based on the local pound (which after metrication was considered equivalent to half a kilogram), and those uprated to being based on the kilogram.

In Albania, Ethiopia (kuntal), and India, the 100 kilogram definition may have been introduced via Islamic trade.  It is a standard measurement of mass for agricultural products in those countries.

In France it used to be defined as 100  (pounds), about 48.95 kg, and has been redefined as 100 kg, thus called metric quintal with symbol qq.

The German  and the Danish  are pound-based, and thus since metrication are defined as 50 kg, whereas the Austrian and Swiss  since metrication has been re-defined as 100 kg.

Common agricultural units used in the Soviet Union were the 100-kilogram  and the term "centner per hectare". These are still used by countries that were part of the Soviet Union.

English use

The German  was introduced to the English language via Hanseatic trade as a measure of the weight of certain crops including hops for beer production.

The quintal was defined in the United States in 1866 as 100 kilograms. However, it is no longer used in the United States or by NIST, though it still appears in the statute.

In France, Italy, Poland, the Czech Republic, Slovakia, Indonesia and in India, it is still in daily use by farmers. It is also used in some African countries including Angola.

See also
 Hundredweight

References

Units of mass
Non-SI metric units
Customary units of measurement
Metricated units

ur:قنطار